Dead Confederate is the eponymous debut EP by Georgia-based psychedelic rock band Dead Confederate.

Track listing

Personnel
Dead Confederate
 Hardy Morris - vocals, electric guitar, acoustic guitar
 Brantley Senn - bass, vocals
 Walker Howle - electric guitar
 John Watkins - keyboards
 Jason Scarboro - drums

Production
 Mike McCarthy - mixing
 Jim Vollentine - assistant engineer
 Kris Sampson - recorded "Tortured-Artist Saint", "Get Out", and "Shadow The Walls" at Nickel & Dime Studios in Atlanta, GA.
 Billy Bennett - recorded "The Rat" at Chase Park Transduction in Athens, GA.
 Brantley Senn - recorded "Memorial Day Night" at home.

References

External links
 Official Website - Dead Confederate

2008 EPs
Dead Confederate albums